The 2005–06 season was Levski Sofia's 84th season in the First League. This article shows player statistics and all matches (official and friendly) that the club has played during the 2005–06 season.

First-team squad
Squad at end of season

Left club during season

Results

Supercup

A Group

Table

Results summary

Results by round

Fixtures and results

Bulgarian Cup

Levski advanced to Round 3.

Levski are eliminated.

UEFA Cup

Second qualifying round

First round

Group F

Round of 32

Round of 16

Quarter-finals

References

External links 
 2005–06 Levski Sofia season

PFC Levski Sofia seasons
Levski Sofia
Bulgarian football championship-winning seasons